Pedro Rafael Amado Mendes (born 6 December 1993) is a Portuguese professional footballer who plays as an attacking midfielder and is currently a free agent.

Club career

Portugal
Born in Barreiro, Setúbal District of Angolan descent, Mendes spent the vast majority of his career in the Portuguese lower leagues. He joined Primeira Liga club Vitória F.C. as a 16-year-old, making his Primeira Liga debut with the first team on 6 November 2011 when he came on as a second-half substitute in a 0–0 home draw against Gil Vicente FC, being subsequently praised by manager Bruno Ribeiro.

Mendes also had a brief spell in the Angolan Girabola, with C.R.D. Libolo.

Romania
On 16 June 2017, Mendes left C.D. Pinhalnovense and joined CSM Politehnica Iași from the Romanian Liga I. He made his debut in the first league game of the season, against CS Universitatea Craiova.

Returned to the country after a very brief spell in Latvia with FK Ventspils, on 7 July 2019 Mendes signed a two-year contract with Liga II side FC Universitatea Cluj. Two months later, however, he left by mutual consent.

Hong Kong
On 26 October 2020, it was confirmed that Mendes had signed with Hong Kong Premier League club Southern. On 21 May 2021, Mendes left the club due to injury.

References

External links

1993 births
Living people
Sportspeople from Barreiro, Portugal
Portuguese sportspeople of Angolan descent
Portuguese footballers
Association football midfielders
Primeira Liga players
Liga Portugal 2 players
Segunda Divisão players
Vitória F.C. players
Clube Oriental de Lisboa players
C.D. Pinhalnovense players
Girabola players
C.R.D. Libolo players
Liga I players
Liga II players
Hong Kong Premier League players
FC Politehnica Iași (2010) players
CS Gaz Metan Mediaș players
FC Universitatea Cluj players
FK Ventspils players
Southern District FC players
Portuguese expatriate footballers
Expatriate footballers in Angola
Expatriate footballers in Romania
Expatriate footballers in Latvia
Expatriate footballers in Hong Kong
Portuguese expatriate sportspeople in Angola
Portuguese expatriate sportspeople in Romania
Portuguese expatriate sportspeople in Latvia
Portuguese expatriate sportspeople in Hong Kong